= Weather-related fatalities in the United States =

Select (US) annual weather-related deaths
	1997	1998	1999	2000	2001	2002
Floods	118	136	68	38	49	49
Lightning strikes	42	44	46	51	44	51
Tornadoes	68	130	94	43	40	55
Temperature extremes	123	182	509	170	170	178
Hurricanes	1	9	17	0	24	53
Snow/Ice	89	76	66	57	33	33
Source: National Climatic Data Center

Weather-related fatalities in the United States may be caused by extreme temperatures, such as abnormal heat or cold, flooding, lightning, tornado, hurricane, wind, rip currents, and others. The National Weather Service compiles statistics on weather-related fatalities and publishes reports every year. In 2016, flooding was the number-one cause of weather-related fatalities, but over a 30-year period, on average, extreme heat is the deadliest form of weather.

The table at right represents a 6-year period and only a select type of recorded weather events. The data was tabulated by running searches on the specified weather events recorded with at least 1 fatality. The yearly timeframes were selected to cover January 1 to December 31 of each year for each event type. The table does not provide a comprehensive total of all weather-related events. It is not necessarily a weather event severity comparison, but is more of an indicator of frequency of fatal occurrences for some events. The leading cause of fatalities is in temperature extremes category, which includes heat waves as well as cold extremes.

== Heat-related deaths ==
The heat-related death rate in the U.S. (heat being either an underlying or a contributing cause) has increased since the mid 2010s.

Between 1979 and 2014, the death rate as a direct result of exposure to heat (underlying cause of death) generally hovered around 0.5 to 1 deaths per million people, with spikes in certain years. Overall, a total of more than 9,000 Americans have died from heat-related causes since 1979, according to death certificates.

== Cold-related deaths ==
Cold weather is deadly too. For example, in the US, 21 people died in a cold wave in January 2014, which also caused property damage valued at US$2.5 billion
